Cosby is an American television sitcom that aired on CBS from September 16, 1996, to April 28, 2000. The program starred Bill Cosby (in his final series) and Phylicia Rashad, who had previously worked together in the NBC sitcom The Cosby Show (1984–1992). Madeline Kahn portrayed their neighborly friend, Pauline, until her death in 1999. The show was adapted from the British sitcom One Foot in the Grave.

Premise
Set at the corner of 33rd Ave and 1539 Blake St. Astoria in Queens, Cosby portrayed grumpy Hilton Lucas, a New York City man forced into early retirement from his job as an airline customer service agent. His wife Ruth was again played by Phylicia Rashad. Initially, Telma Hopkins was cast as Ruth Lucas; however, she was recast after she reacted poorly to Cosby's tendency to ad libitum. The couple had one daughter, Erica Lucas, initially portrayed by Audra McDonald and later portrayed by T'Keyah Crystal Keymáh. Doug E. Doug played Griffin Vesey, a foster son the Lucas family took in when he was younger. Griffin occasionally tried to win Erica's affections, but they decided just to remain friends when in the fourth and final season, Darien Sills-Evans portrayed Darien Evans, Erica's fiancé/husband. Jurnee Smollett also joined the cast as 11-year-old Jurnee, whom Hilton adored.

The show was based on the concept from the BBC series One Foot in the Grave, starring Richard Wilson and Annette Crosbie. David Renwick, the creator and writer of One Foot in the Grave, was listed as a consultant of Cosby. One Foot in the Grave was notable for containing dark humor for a mainstream sitcom. The tone was significantly lightened for Cosby, although certain controversial scenes, such as a scene in which the lead character incinerates a live tortoise, albeit by accident, were recreated (though, in this version, with a turtle).

A notable later episode was the fourth-season premiere, "My Spy", which showed Hilton watching an episode of I Spy (the 1960s series in which Cosby co-starred) and then dreaming an adventure with Robert Culp's character from that series; the episode ends with a brief dream sequence in which Rashad dreams she is playing her previous character from The Cosby Show. The same season also presented an episode entitled "Loving Madeline" which featured the standard opening credits for the series but was in fact a tribute to Kahn featuring the cast members out of character discussing the recently deceased actress, punctuated by clips from past episodes.

Cosby premiered to an audience of more than 24.7 million viewers, but averaged 16 million viewers during the course of the season. As the series progressed, ratings shrank and CBS, fresh with new hit comedies in Everybody Loves Raymond and The King of Queens, decided to move the series from Monday to Wednesday, then to the Friday night death slot. The moves led to a drop in ratings. At the end of the fourth season, having accumulated 96 episodes, Cosby and CBS executive Les Moonves mutually decided to end the series. The last episode, "The Song Remains the Same", aired on April 28, 2000, and was the 96th episode to be produced and broadcast, drawing just over 7 million viewers.

Episodes

Cast

Main
Bill Cosby — Hilton Lucas
Phylicia Rashad — Ruth Lucas
T'Keyah Crystal Keymáh — Erica Lucas
Doug E. Doug — Griffin Vesey
Madeline Kahn — Pauline Fox
Jurnee Smollett — Jurnee (season 3; recurring season 2)
Darien Sills-Evans — Darien Hall (seasons 3–4)

Recurring
Angelo Massagli — Angelo (season 2)
Sinbad — Daniel (season 3)

Reruns/syndication
The series was distributed by Carsey-Werner Distribution for broadcast syndication for the 2000–2001 television season, where it ran until the fall of 2004; after that point it was offered in low-cost barter arrangements. TBS shortly thereafter ran reruns of the series for about two years. In March 2010, Up TV (the current UP Network) began airing the show, but as a family network with religious ownership, removed some episodes and edited some content in episodes to meet the network's mores. It began to air on Bounce TV in January 2015, but was removed from air on July 7, 2015, when records were made public regarding Bill Cosby's sexual assault cases. Two seasons are available through Hoopla. All 4 seasons are listed for streaming on Amazon Prime but not currently available for actual streaming.

Nielsen ratings
Cosby was considered to be a ratings success for CBS, winning its time slot of Monday, 8:00 PM in households and viewers for the first three seasons.

References

External links
Cosby @ CBS' Official Website
Cosby @ Carsey-Werner.net (en)
Carsey-Werner Cosby

Bill Cosby
1990s American black sitcoms
1990s American sitcoms
2000s American sitcoms
1996 American television series debuts
2000s American black sitcoms
2000 American television series endings
American television series based on British television series
CBS original programming
English-language television shows
Television series about families
Television series by Carsey-Werner Productions
Television series created by Bill Cosby
Television shows filmed in New York City
Television shows set in New York City